Lt. Gen. (Retd.) Vasantha R. Raghavan is a former Indian military general and now a security consultant. He retired as the director general of military operations in 1994, having served in the Indian Army for 37 years. After retiring from the army, he has written several books and is currently the director of the Delhi Policy Group and president of the Centre for Security Analysis in Chennai.

Military career
Raghavan was commissioned in the Punjab Regiment in 1957. He graduated in 1968 from the Royal Military College of Science and the Army Staff College in the UK. He was the commanding general in the Siachen and Kargil sectors during some of the intense combat actions in the area. He was closely involved in the formulation of the Sino-Indian accord on maintaining peace on the borders and in the series of negotiations with Pakistan on the Siachen dispute. As director general of military operations, he was closely involved in strategic planning and field force management of the army. He was awarded the PVSM, UYSM, and AVSM honours by the Government of India.

Publications
Raghavan has written four books since retiring from military service:

By the Land and Sea: A History of the Punjab Regiment
India’s Need for Strategic Balance
Infantry in India
Siachen: Conflict Without End

He has also edited several books:

Internal Conflicts in Myanmar
Nuclear Disarmament - India-EU Perspective
Internal Conflicts in Nepal- Transnational Consequences
The Naxal Threat: Causes, State Responses and Consequence
Conflict in Sri Lanka: Internal and External Consequences
Conflicts in the Northeast: Internal and External Effects (jointly edited with Sanjoy Hazarika)
Jammu and Kashmir - Impact on Polity, Society and Economy
Post Conflict Sri Lanka - Rebuilding of Society

He has also edited more than a dozen other books and written numerous articles on strategic issues relating to India's security.

Later activities and security advocacy
In his book on the Siachen conflict, he argues that neither India nor Pakistan gain a strategic advantage from the occupation of the Saltoro range and proposes a road map for conflict resolution. His piece on "Limited War and Nuclear Escalation in South Asia" in the Nonproliferation Review in 2001 concluded that there was a high probability of a nuclear exchange between India and Pakistan in the event of a direct military conflict between the two countries. Raghavan was a member of the independent Commission on Weapons of Mass Destruction set up at the initiative of the Swedish Government and headed by Dr. Hans Blix. The Commission released a report, entitled "Weapons of Terror: Freeing the World of Nuclear, Biological and Chemical Arms in 2006", which proposed that nuclear, chemical, and biological weapons be outlawed and discussed the options for achieving this goal.

He was also a member of the Indian Government's Review Committee of the Armed Forces Special Powers Act, which had been opposed in Manipur and other parts of North-East India. Although the government has not published the committee's 2005 report, it was reported that the panel recommended that the act be repealed. Raghavan has argued that security should be viewed in terms of human security in societal, environmental, economic, and political terms, instead of the narrow military perspective.

See also
1987 Sino-Indian skirmish
Events leading to the Sino-Indian War
Kargil War
Origins of the Sino-Indian border dispute
Sino-Indian War
Sino-Indian relations

Notes

External links
The Hindu
Website of Publisher of His books
Centre for Security Analysis, Chennai Publication

Year of birth missing (living people)
Living people
Indian generals
Indian military writers